Setaphis is a genus of ground spiders that was first described by Eugène Simon in 1893.

Species
 it contains twenty-one species:
Setaphis algerica (Dalmas, 1922) – Spain, Algeria
Setaphis atlantica (Berland, 1936) – Cape Verde Is.
Setaphis browni (Tucker, 1923) – Central, South Africa to Pakistan, India
Setaphis canariensis (Simon, 1883) – Canary Is., Madeira
Setaphis carmeli (O. Pickard-Cambridge, 1872) – Canary Is., Mediterranean
Setaphis fuscipes (Simon, 1885) – Morocco to Israel
Setaphis gomerae (Schmidt, 1981) – Canary Is.
Setaphis jocquei Platnick & Murphy, 1996 – Ivory Coast
Setaphis makalali FitzPatrick, 2005 – South Africa
Setaphis mediterranea Levy, 2009 – Israel
Setaphis mollis (O. Pickard-Cambridge, 1874) – North Africa, Israel
Setaphis murphyi Wunderlich, 2011 – Canary Is.
Setaphis parvula (Lucas, 1846) (type) – Mediterranean
Setaphis salrei Schmidt, 1999 – Cape Verde Is.
Setaphis sexmaculata Simon, 1893 – South Africa
Setaphis simplex (Simon, 1885) – Tunisia
Setaphis spiribulbis (Denis, 1952) – Morocco
Setaphis subtilis (Simon, 1897) – West, South Africa to Philippines
Setaphis villiersi (Denis, 1955) – Niger, Somalia, Ethiopia
Setaphis walteri Platnick & Murphy, 1996 – Canary Is.
Setaphis wunderlichi Platnick & Murphy, 1996 – Canary Is.

References

Araneomorphae genera
Gnaphosidae
Spiders of Africa
Spiders of Asia
Taxa named by Eugène Simon